13th Avenue station is a Regional Transportation District (RTD) light rail station on the R Line in Aurora, Colorado. The station is located alongside Interstate 225, a few blocks west of intersection of 13th Avenue and Sable Boulevard. It has a 262-stall park-and-ride lot and is planned to be the center of a transit-oriented development.

The station opened on February 24, 2017, along with the rest of the R Line.

References

RTD light rail stations
Transportation buildings and structures in Aurora, Colorado
Railway stations in the United States opened in 2017
2017 establishments in Colorado